The  is a tilting diesel multiple unit (DMU) train type operated by Hokkaido Railway Company (JR Hokkaido) on limited express services in Hokkaido, Japan, since 1997. They were based on the KiHa 281 series trains introduced in 1994.

Operations
KiHa 283 series trainsets have been used on the following services.
 Okhotsk services, since 18 March 2023
 Taisetsu services, since 18 March 2023

History
A three-car pre-production set was delivered from Fuji Heavy Industries in 1995 for evaluation and testing.

From the start of the revised timetable on 12 March 2022, all Ōzora limited express services are scheduled to be operated by KiHa 261 series DMUs; the KiHa 283 series DMUs were withdrawn from Ōzora limited express services on 11 March 2022. The KiHa 283 series was reallocated for use on Okhotsk and Taisetsu limited express services on the Sekihoku Main Line from 18 March 2023, operating as three-car sets and replacing the older KiHa 183 series DMUs used on these services.

2011 Sekishō Line derailment and fire
On 27 May 2011, a 6-car KiHa 283 series train was destroyed by fire after it derailed and made an emergency stop inside the  No. 1 Niniu Tunnel on the Sekishō Line in Shimukappu, at around 21:55, while forming the Super Ōzora 14 service from Kushiro to Sapporo. The train was formed as follows, with car 1 at the Kushiro end. All cars were gutted by fire, and were officially withdrawn on 30 June 2011.

References

External links

 JR Hokkaido KiHa 283 Super Ōzora train information 
 JR Hokkaido KiHa 281/283 Super Hokuto train information 
 JR Hokkaido KiHa 261/283 Super Tokachi train information 

283 series
Hokkaido Railway Company
Tilting trains
Train-related introductions in 1997
283